Walter Scott (born 1908, date of death unknown) was a Unionist politician in Northern Ireland.

Scott worked as a building contractor, and was elected to Belfast City Council in 1959, for the Ulster Unionist Party.  In 1961, he won a by-election in Belfast Bloomfield and was elected to the Parliament of Northern Ireland, holding his seat at each subsequent election, until the body was prorogued in 1972.  From 1969 until 1972, he served as Chairman of Ways and Means and Deputy Speaker. He stood unsuccessfully as a pro-White Paper Unionist candidate in the election to the 1973 Northern Ireland Assembly.

References

1908 births
Year of death missing
Members of Belfast City Council
Members of the House of Commons of Northern Ireland 1958–1962
Members of the House of Commons of Northern Ireland 1962–1965
Members of the House of Commons of Northern Ireland 1965–1969
Members of the House of Commons of Northern Ireland 1969–1973
Ulster Unionist Party members of the House of Commons of Northern Ireland
Members of the House of Commons of Northern Ireland for Belfast constituencies